In algebraic geometry, a Humbert surface, studied by , is a surface in the moduli space of principally polarized abelian surfaces consisting of the surfaces with a symmetric endomorphism of some fixed discriminant.

References

Humbert, G., Sur les fonctionnes abéliennes singulières. I, II, III. J. Math. Pures Appl. serie 5, t. V, 233–350 (1899); t. VI, 279–386 (1900); t. VII, 97–123 (1901)

Algebraic surfaces
Complex surfaces